Charlton Horethorne is a village and civil parish in Somerset, England, situated five miles north-east of Sherborne and five miles south-west of Wincanton in the South Somerset district.  The village has a population of 591. The parish also includes Stowell.

The village lies on the Monarch's Way long-distance footpath that approximates the escape route taken by King Charles II in 1651 after being defeated in the Battle of Worcester.

Charlton Horethorne in the 21st century is a village with successful businesses, a primary school and a village hall that was purchased in 1923 from the Army as a memorial to the fallen in the First World War. Despite its age and the fact that it was previously used as a wooden mess hall, it is used on a frequent and regular basis by a wide range of groups and activities.

The village benefits from the presence of The Village Shop and a pub called The Kings Arms that offers food and accommodation.

History 

The village was originally known just as Charlton, meaning "the farmers settlement" and then known as Charlton Kanville by 1225. In 1084 Horethorn was added coming from "Hareturna" meaning "grey thornbush". The parish was part of the hundred of Horethorne.

Evidence of early human occupation of the parish is provided by three Bronze-Age barrows and a possible Iron-Age camp on the escarpment near Sigwells, an area to the west of the village where Mesolithic and Romano-British material has also been found. Around 950 the manor belonged to Wynflaed (d. c. 950), and may have passed to her daughter Aethelflaed. It was held by Vitel in 1066 and, by the time of the Domesday Book in 1086, by Robert son of Gerold (d. 1102), who paid an annual rent of 100 cheeses. In 1439 it was bought by Henry Beaufort, Bishop of Winchester, who gave the manor to the Hospital of St Cross, Winchester in 1445.

The Manor Farm House in Horse Lane was built as the local manor house in 1608.

RNAS Charlton Horethorne (HMS Heron II) was a Royal Naval Air Service station in nearby Sigwells. It opened in 1942 as a flying training base under the administrative care of HMS Heron. It closed in 1948 and has since been returned to agricultural use.

Governance 

The parish council has responsibility for local issues, including setting an annual precept (local rate) to cover the council's operating costs and producing annual accounts for public scrutiny. The parish council evaluates local planning applications and works with the local police, district council officers, and neighbourhood watch groups on matters of crime, security, and traffic. The parish council's role also includes initiating projects for the maintenance and repair of parish facilities, as well as consulting with the district council on the maintenance, repair, and improvement of highways, drainage, footpaths, public transport, and street cleaning. Conservation matters (including trees and listed buildings) and environmental issues are also the responsibility of the council.

The village falls within the Non-metropolitan district of South Somerset, which was formed on 1 April 1974 under the Local Government Act 1972, having previously been part of Wincanton Rural District. The district council is responsible for local planning and building control, local roads, council housing, environmental health, markets and fairs, refuse collection and recycling, cemeteries and crematoria, leisure services, parks, and tourism.

Somerset County Council is responsible for running the largest and most expensive local services such as education, social services, libraries, main roads, public transport, policing and fire services, trading standards, waste disposal and strategic planning.

It is also part of the Somerton and Frome county constituency represented in the House of Commons of the Parliament of the United Kingdom. It elects one Member of Parliament (MP) by the first past the post system of election, and was part of the South West England constituency of the European Parliament prior to Britain leaving the European Union in January 2020, which elected seven MEPs using the d'Hondt method of party-list proportional representation.

Religious sites 

The 12th-century Church of St Peter and St Paul acquired its two-stage tower in the late 15th century. It has offset corner buttresses almost to the full height of the tower with small crowning pinnacles. A Romano-British altar was discovered in the churchyard.

References

External links 

 Village website

Villages in South Somerset
Civil parishes in Somerset